Tilen Klemenčič (born 21 August 1995) is a Slovenian football defender who plays for Domžale in the Slovenian PrvaLiga.

References

External links
NZS profile 

1995 births
Living people
Slovenian footballers
Association football defenders
NK Triglav Kranj players
NK Celje players
NK Domžale players
Slovenian PrvaLiga players
Slovenia youth international footballers